Vincent Rabiega (born 14 June 1995) is a professional footballer who plays as a forward for Tennis Borussia Berlin.

Born in Germany, he represented Poland at youth international level. He has played club football in Germany and England for BFC Preussen, Hertha BSC, RB Leipzig II and Bradford City. Vincent Rabiega to stay with BFC till 2019.

Club career
Born in Berlin, Rabiega spent his early career in Germany with BFC Preussen, Hertha BSC and RB Leipzig II. Following a trial with the club, he signed a one-year contract with English club Bradford City in August 2016. He made his debut for them on 27 August 2016, in a 1–1 home draw in the league against Oldham Athletic. He left the club by mutual consent and moved to the Berliner FC Dynamo in January 2017.

International career
Rabiega has represented Poland at youth international level, scoring three goals in 10 games in 2012 for the under-17 team. He also played for them at under-19 and under-20 level.

Family
His father ir chess grandmaster Robert Rabiega.

References

External links
Vincent Rabiega at FuPa

1995 births
Living people
Footballers from Berlin
Polish footballers
Poland youth international footballers
German footballers
German people of Polish descent
BFC Preussen players
Hertha BSC players
RB Leipzig players
Bradford City A.F.C. players
Berliner FC Dynamo players
Tennis Borussia Berlin players
English Football League players
Regionalliga players
Association football forwards